Losap is an atoll located in the Eastern Islands or Upper Mortlock Islands group in the outer islands region of the state of Chuuk in the Federated States of Micronesia.

Losap is also the name of one of the four islands in the atoll. There are 3 villages in Losap: Pekias, Sotiw, and Lukan which also have groups in the villages.

Linguistics
The outer islands have different ways of saying Chuukese words; their accent is different from the Chuuk Lagoon people.

Villages and groups

References

External links
 Directory of the islands of Micronesia

Islands of Chuuk State
Municipalities of Chuuk State
Atolls of the Federated States of Micronesia